In geometry, the spiral of Theodorus (also called square root spiral, Einstein spiral, Pythagorean spiral, or Pythagoras's snail) is a spiral composed of right triangles, placed edge-to-edge. It was named after Theodorus of Cyrene.

Construction
The spiral is started with an isosceles right triangle, with each leg having unit length. Another right triangle is formed, an automedian right triangle with one leg being the hypotenuse of the prior triangle (with length the square root of 2) and the other leg having length of 1; the length of the hypotenuse of this second triangle is the square root of 3. The process then repeats; the th triangle in the sequence is a right triangle with the side lengths  and 1, and with hypotenuse .

History and uses 
Although all of Theodorus' work has been lost, Plato put Theodorus into his dialogue Theaetetus, which tells of his work. It is assumed that Theodorus had proved that all of the square roots of non-square integers from 3 to 17 are irrational by means of the Spiral of Theodorus.

Plato does not attribute the irrationality of the square root of 2 to Theodorus, because it was well known before him. Theodorus and Theaetetus split the rational numbers and irrational numbers into different categories.

Hypotenuse

The reason is commonly believed to be that the  hypotenuse belongs to the last triangle that does not overlap the figure.

Overlapping
In 1958, Kaleb Williams proved that no two hypotenuses will ever coincide, regardless of how far the spiral is continued. Also, if the sides of unit length are extended into a line, they will never pass through any of the other vertices of the total figure.

Extension

If the spiral is continued to infinitely many triangles, many more interesting characteristics are found.

Growth rate

Angle
If  is the angle of the th triangle (or spiral segment), then:

Therefore, the growth of the angle  of the next triangle  is:

The sum of the angles of the first  triangles is called the total angle  for the th triangle.

where

().

Radius
The growth of the radius of the spiral at a certain triangle  is

Archimedean spiral
The Spiral of Theodorus approximates the Archimedean spiral. Just as the distance between two windings of the Archimedean spiral equals mathematical constant , as the number of spins of the spiral of Theodorus approaches infinity, the distance between two consecutive windings quickly approaches .

The following is a table showing of two windings of the spiral approaching pi:

Continuous curve

Davis found the function

which was further studied by his student Leader and by Iserles (in an appendix to  ).

the initial condition  and monotonicity in both argument and modulus; alternative conditions and weakenings are also studied therein.

In the figure the nodes of the original (discrete) Theodorus spiral are shown as small green circles. The blue ones are those, added in the opposite direction of the spiral.
Only nodes  with the integer value of the polar radius  are numbered in the figure.

See also
Fermat's spiral
List of spirals

References

Further reading
 
 
 
 

Theodorus
Pythagorean theorem
Pi